The first USS Dash (AM-88) was an Adroit class minesweeper of the United States Navy.

The ship was laid down on 6 April 1942 by the Commercial Iron Works of Portland, Oregon, launched on 20 June 1942, and commissioned on 27 October 1942. Dash was reclassified as the  submarine chaser PC-1592 on 1 June 1944, and decommissioned on 10 May 1946 at Pearl Harbor, Hawaii. The ship was transferred to the War Assets Administration for disposal on 19 December 1947. Fate unknown.

World War II Pacific Theatre operations 
Putting to sea from San Pedro, California on 3 January 1943 Dash arrived at Noumea on 25 February, escorting convoys to Pearl Harbor and Pago Pago, Samoa, en route. She operated out of Nouméa on local escort duty and anti-submarine patrol until 9 April when she steamed to Suva, Fiji Islands, to relieve  as local escort and patrol vessel.

Rescue activities 
From 3 to 7 May she escorted the torpedoed  to the safety of Suva.

Inter-Island operations 
Dash escorted a convoy to Guadalcanal between 26 July and 16 August 1943, then began steady duty between Noumea, Efate, and Espiritu Santo. Returning to Guadalcanal on 4 October she swept mines off Kolombangara Island from 23 October to 6 November, then returned to escort duty between the Solomons and Nouméa and Espiritu Santo. Aside from a voyage to Auckland, New Zealand between 16 January and 1 February 1944 escorting , Dash alternated escort duty and patrol in the Solomons, New Hebrides, and New Caledonia until the end of the war. She was reclassified as the submarine chaser PC-1592 on 1 June 1944.

As a submarine chaser 
PC-1592 remained in the South Pacific, operating in the Fiji Islands and Samoa until her return to Pearl Harbor.

Post-War deactivation 
She was decommissioned there 10 May 1946, and transferred to the War Assets Administration for disposal 19 December 1947.

References

External links
 

 

Adroit-class minesweepers
Ships built in Portland, Oregon
1942 ships
World War II minesweepers of the United States
World War II patrol vessels of the United States